"Whippin" is a song by American singer Kiiara, featuring American electronic music producer Felix Snow and was included on her debut studio album Lil Kiiwi. It was released on April 12, 2017 through Atlantic Records.

Composition 
"Whippin" is in the key of F minor, and moves at a tempo of 83 beats per minute in a 4/4 time signature. It features electronic voice glitches over a hip hop-inspired beat. It was compared to her hit single "Gold."

Critical reception
Mike Wass of Idolator said "'Whippin' is all about capturing a vibe via a repetitive chorus and demented electronic production. There is a little more bite this time, however, courtesy of Kiiara's fiery verses." Sam Murphy of The Interns wrote that "there are similarities to 'Gold' but ultimately it’s a new beast with even sweeter hooks." The Musical Hype was more critical of the song, writing that it called for "no need for deep analysis." He additionally called the second verse "forced," and wrote that "anyone could’ve recorded 'Whippin.'"

Music video 
The music video for "Whippin" was released on May 8, 2017 and it was directed by Colin Tilley. It features Kiiara on a variety of different modes of transportation.

Track listing

Charts

Certifications

Release history

References

2017 singles
2017 songs
Kiiara songs
Atlantic Records singles
Songs written by David Singer-Vine
Songs written by Kurtis Mckenzie